W233BF (94.5 FM) is a radio station in metro Atlanta, now licensed to serve Atlanta owned by Edgewater Broadcasting. After a series of moves (previously serving the eastern exurb of Social Circle), the station now transmits from the WUPA tower east of downtown, just north of Interstate 20.  The station broadcasts an urban contemporary music format, with a heavy emphasis on local artists, and is less mainstream than other similar stations in the format such as WHTA and WVEE.

W233BF is owned by Edgewater Broadcasting, though operated by Core Communications.

Originally applied-for in 2003, the station went on the air in July 2007, and immediately requested permission to move to 105.3, becoming W287BI.  Due to RF interference from full-power WBZY, it requested to go back to 94.5 in July 2010, regaining its old frequency (and therefore callsign) by December that year.  In November however, it had already applied to move closer to Atlanta, where it was located north of Conyers, broadcasting a Christian radio format as The Spirit 94.5.  In late March 2012, it applied to move to the WUPA tower in the Inman Park neighborhood east of downtown Atlanta. On June 23, 2012, the station flipped to its current local-emphasizing hip hop format, branded as "Streetz 94.5." The station also exchanged RF interference with two co-channel stations: WIPK in northwest Georgia, and WFDR-FM Woodbury.  Due to complaints from WFDR, an application was filed with the FCC in early August 2012 to reduce power to 185 watts at the same height and location, and switch to an omnidirectional antenna. In April 2015, it purchased WFDR-FM, effectively removing its biggest hindrance with expanding in the Atlanta area, and that station now also rebroadcasts WSTR-HD3.

In January 2015, the station also purchased and began simulcasting on WIPK FM 94.5 in northwest Georgia, similar to the situation with WTSH-FM and W296BB on 107.1, which also serve northwest Georgia and metro Atlanta respectively.  The approximate "boundary" between the two stations' signals is the ridge that includes Kennesaw Mountain and Sweat Mountain. In October of that year, however, WIPK split from the simulcast and flipped to CHR as "i94.5." As of April 2018, the station would begin simulcasting on WWSZ AM 1420 in Decatur.

From the launch of "Streetz" in 2012 until late 2019, the translator was fed by the HD3 sub-channel of WSTR (94.1). This would be dropped after WSTR's owner Entercom acquired long-time urban station (and competitor) WVEE, and flipped the HD3 channel to their "Channel Q" network.

References

External links
Streetz 94.5 official site

See also
List of FM broadcast translators used as primary stations

Hip hop radio stations
233BF
Radio stations established in 2007
2007 establishments in Georgia (U.S. state)